Bradley Joseph Thompson (born January 31, 1982) is an American former professional baseball pitcher. He played in Major League Baseball (MLB) for the St. Louis Cardinals and Kansas City Royals from 2005 to 2010.

Career
Thompson was drafted by the St. Louis Cardinals in the 16th round of the 2002 amateur draft out of Dixie State College of Utah. He holds the AA single-season scoreless innings streak. He made his major league debut on May 8, 2005.  In his rookie season, he had 40 appearances and a 2.95 ERA in 55 innings pitched. On July 3, 2006, Thompson was sent down to the Cardinals' AAA affiliate, the Memphis Redbirds.

In 2007, Thompson, who had been in and out of the Cardinals' starting rotation, finished with an 8–6 record and a 4.73 ERA to go with 53 strikeouts. In 2008, he pitched 6.2 scoreless innings and picked up the win in his first start. He was then optioned to Memphis on April 23, 2008, then released on November 4, 2009.

Thompson signed with the Kansas City Royals for the 2010 season but was released on June 3 when he chose to become a free agent after he was designated for assignment.  He then signed with the Houston Astros but was released in August.

He was injured for the 2011 season and played winter baseball in the Dominican Republic to get ready for the 2012 season.

The Minnesota Twins signed him to a minor league contract on January 19, 2012; he pitched for their AAA affiliate, The Rochester Red Wings.

Thompson currently co-hosts The Fast Lane, a sports radio show in St. Louis, on 101 ESPN with Anthony Stalter and Jamie Rivers and serves as a color commentator and analyst for Bally Sports Midwest.

Personal life
Thompson married his wife, Andrea Kotys Thompson, in 2008. They reside in St. Louis, Missouri with their son and daughter.

References

External links

1982 births
Utah Tech Trailblazers baseball players
Living people
Major League Baseball pitchers
Baseball players from Nevada
People from the Las Vegas Valley
St. Louis Cardinals players
Kansas City Royals players
Palm Beach Cardinals players
Peoria Chiefs players
Memphis Redbirds players
Tennessee Smokies players
Omaha Royals players
Bridgeport Bluefish players
New Britain Rock Cats players
Somerset Patriots players
Major League Baseball broadcasters
St. Louis Cardinals announcers